Vlasta Prachatická (27 November 1929 – 27 April 2022) was a Czech portrait sculptor, honorary member of the British Society of Portrait Sculptors.

Life 
After the war, she spent a year at the Higher Industrial School of Sculpture and Stonemasonry in Hořice, where her teacher was Myslbek's pupil Prof. Jaroslav Plichta. In 1946–1951 she studied at the Academy of Fine Arts in Prague in the studio of Professor Otakar Španiel. Her graduation Portrait of mother, exhibited in 1951, was purchased by the National Gallery. In 1952 she acquired an apartment in Prague 7, Nad Královskou oborou 23, which she partly used as a studio.

In 1953 she married the sculptor Stanislav Kolíbal. Their daughter Markéta Prachatická (born 1953), is an artist, their son Pavel Kolíbal (born 1956), is an architect.

In 1952, she took part in a joint exhibition at the Academy in Berlin and in 1957 in a joint exhibition of five artists in the Aleš Hall of the Umělecká beseda, prepared by the art historian František Matouš. In the 1960s she became a member of the UB 12 group and exhibited at all its exhibitions until 1965. The members of UB 12 mostly studied at the Academy of Arts, Architecture and Design in Prague, where prevailed a freer creative spirit than at the Academy and their interest in modern art also influenced Vlasta Prachatická.

In 1967 she was invited to join an exhibition of five sculptors at the Václav Špála Gallery (Pacík, Zoubek, Kmentová, Vinopalová, Prachatická) and represented Czechoslovakia at the Sculpture Biennale in Middelheim, Belgium. She won the competition for a portrait of Jan Masaryk for the entrance hall of the Ministry of Foreign Affairs, but after the Warsaw Pact invasion of Czechoslovakia the bust was never installed.

In 1968 she accompanied Stanislav Kolíbal on his study stay in Vence. Thanks to Kolíbal's scholarship from the Deutscher Akademischer Austauschdienst (DAAD), she spent the years 1988 and 1989 in Berlin. Thanks to the support of the Calder Foundation, she spent half a year in Saché, France in 1992. Since 2006 she has been an honorary member of the British Society of Portrait Sculptors.

Vlasta Prachatická lived and worked in Prague.

Work 
Since her student days she has been working on sculptural portraits. Initially, she portrayed well-known people from her surroundings - her mother, her father, her friend, Daisy Mrázek. She started from the classical principles concerning surface modelling as formulated by leading sculptors: Despiau - "even the smallest part of a sculpture's surface must have a life of its own", Rodin - "the sculptor, like the builder, kneads and models light and shadow", or Giacometti - "heads are matter in constant motion, a mutable form, never quite graspable".

She avoided psychologising and formal stylisation of portraits, but was aware of the significant relationship between the anatomical structure of the skull and the relief representation of the face, which is an expression of the tension of skin and muscles. She was inspired by the impressionist modelling of Medardo Rosso and the balance of Charles Despiau's works, which remain faithful to the subject without suppressing artistic imagery. The closest Czech sculptor to her was Josef Kaplický, whose portrait reflected the legacy of the avant-garde personified by Otto Gutfreund. The works of her mature period were inspired by the expressive modelling of Marino Marini and the abstracted conception of portraiture by Alberto Giacometti, based on sensory perceptions and emotional stirrings.

The modelling of the face in clay, in particular, lacks luminous qualities and thus affects the likeness of the sitter, while the bronze cast is "too definitive" and at the same time the deadliest. Prachatická therefore prefers the plaster cast, which for her is a real and living original. Moreover, the plaster can be modified or finished with polychromy.

Consistently working on portraits meant the need to get into the personal background and consider the nature and characteristics of the person being portrayed. This was easier in the case of people with whom she and Stanislav Kolíbal were friendly. This circle included the art historian František Matouš, who curated the exhibition of young artists at Umělecká beseda (1957), and his daughter Helena, or the painter Václav Bartovský, one of the founders of UB 12. Prachatická was always keenly interested in modern and classical music and her friends included some well-known musicians and composers (Pavel Bořkovec, Karel Balling). In an attempt to capture the likeness of a person as truthfully as possible, she returned to some of her portraits several years later. She first modelled a portrait of her uncle, the cellist Karel Pravoslav Sádlo, in 1961, but she later destroyed the study herself and did not reach a final portrait until 1985.

Since the turn of the 1960s and 1970s, when she received some public commissions, it was necessary to model without direct contact with the sitter, only on the basis of documentation. Such assignments included the portrait of Ludwig van Beethoven (Hradec nad Moravicí Castle), Karel Hoffmann, Archbishop of Olomouc Antonín Cyril Stojan or Jan Masaryk. Even with the living people she portrayed, she eventually grew tired of the model's stiff expression when sitting in the studio. She preferred to observe people in everyday life and to capture in memory the fleeting facial expressions that give a portrait its natural character. It is the ability to abstract characteristic facial features that makes Vlasta Prachaticka's work unique. Her latest portraits depict mostly people who are no longer alive. For the sculptor, this did not mean a limitation, but rather greater creative freedom.

Quote 
"I have always been interested only in the human face. However, I am not only concerned with expressing the one to whom it belongs. For a few thousand years, actually, people have been interested in it, and in that time, the external changes are not so obvious. We still find types of some ancient portraits around us. But my point is to express, by all artistic means, the head that belongs to our time."

Realisations 
 1969 Ludwig van Beethoven, Hradec nad Moravicí Castle
 1970 commemorative plaque with bust of Josef Bohuslav Foerster, Wattmanngasse 25, Vienna
 1972 Portrait of Archbishop Stojan, St. Moritz Church, Kroměříž
 1972 commemorative plaque with a portrait of Karel Hoffmann, violinist of the Bohemian Quartet
 1978 portrait of Bohuslav Martinů, foyer of the National Theatre, Prague
 1980 Vincenc Kramář, head and memorial plaque, Municipal Library, Mariánské náměstí Prague
 1985 Portrait and memorial plaque of painter Jaroslav Hněvkovský on his family home in Žebrák
 1988 portrait of Josef Šíma, Jaroměř City Museum
 1988 portrait of Josef Bohuslav Foerster, foyer of the National Theatre, Prague
 1997 commemorative plaque with a portrait of Josef Václav Sládek, Resslova 5, Prague 2
 1999 bust of Jan Palach, Všetaty Primary School
 2006 Rainer Maria Rilke, bust and memorial plaque, Na Příkopě 16, Prague 1

Representation in collections 
 National Gallery in Prague
 Gallery of the Central Bohemian Region in Kutná Hora (formerly ČMVU)
 Gallery of the City of Prague
 Gallery of Modern Art in Roudnice nad Labem
 Gallery of Fine Arts in Ostrava
 Art Gallery Karlovy Vary
 Moravian Gallery in Brno
 Museum of Art Olomouc
 Gallery Klatovy / Klenová

Individual exhibitions 
 1961 Daisy Mrázková, Vlasta Prachatická: Portraits, Gallery on Charles Square, Prague
 1985 Vlasta Prachatická : Portraits, Old Town Hall, Prague City Gallery
 2001 Vlasta Prachatická : Portraits, Veletržní palác, National Gallery in Prague
 2001 Vlasta Prachatická : Portraits, Klenová Castle, Klatovy / Klenová Gallery
 2003 Vlasta Prachatická, Municipal Museum and Gallery, Hořice v Podkrkonoší
 2016 Markéta and Vlasta Prachatická: Portraits and Drawings, 1st Floor Gallery, Prague
 2018 Vlasta Prachatická - Portraits, Museum Kampa, Prague, 27 October 2018 – 20 January 2019

Collective exhibitions (selection) 
 1952 Ausstellung Die tschechoslowakische Skulptur, Akademie der Künste, Berlin
 1957 Exhibition of five artists (Prachatická, Kolíbal, Šimotová, John, Burant), Alšova síň Umělecké beseda, Prague 1
 1967 5 Sculptors, Václav Špála Gallery, Prague
 1971 Contemporary Czechoslovak art, Kuwait
 1987 Czech Portrait 1877 - 1987, Central Bohemia Gallery, Prague
 1994 Focal Points of Rebirth, Municipal Library, Prague
 2015 Women Sculptors: A Selection of Significant Czech and Slovak Sculptors, Slovak National Gallery, Bratislava

References

Sources 
 Hynek Glos, Petr Vizina, Stará garda / Old Guard, nakl. Argo, Prague 2016, pp. 56–59, ISBN 978-80-257-1881-0
 Jiří Šetlík: Daisy Mrázková / Vlasta Prachatická, cat. 18 p., Gallery of the Czechoslovak Art Union on Charles Square, Prague 1961
 Vlasta Prachatická: Portraits, 1985, cat. 28 p., GHMP? Prague, Old Town Hall
 Václav Boštík et al., UB 12, cat. 41 p., Art Department of Umělecká Beseda (re-established 1990), Prague 1994
 Jiří Šetlík, Stanislav Kolíbal: Vlasta Prachatická - Portraits, Řevnice: Arbor vitae Publishing House, 2001. ISBN 80-86300-23-4

External links 

 Database of the National Library of the Czech Republic: Vlasta Prachatická
 Vlasta Prachatická in the abART information system
 Vlasta and Markéta Prachatická exhibit together for the first time, Czech TV24, 2016
 Vlasta Prachatická on Artist.cz
 Online exhibition at Art for Good New Life Exhibitions (Ateliers of UB 12 members and their portraits)

1929 births
2022 deaths
Czech sculptors
Czech artists
People from Jičín District